Kompiam - Ambum District is a district of the Enga Province of Papua New Guinea.  Its capital is Kompiam.  The population of the district was 54,624 at the 2011 census.

References

Districts of Papua New Guinea
Enga Province